Sunshine, Kentucky may refer to:
Sunshine, Greenup County, Kentucky
Sunshine, Harlan County, Kentucky